Harpagolestes ("hooked thief") is an extinct genus of hyena like, bear sized mesonychid mesonychian that lived in Central and Eastern Asia and western and central North America during the middle to late Eocene.

Description 

Harpagolestes was a large animal, with a skull length of a half a meter in some species. Fossil specimens have been recovered in the United States, Canada, Mongolia, China, and at least one species in Korea. Harpagolestes exhibits strong, curved canine teeth, a deep lower jaw, massive skull, and heavy wear on the molars. This along with stout limb bones suggest that Harpagolestes was a scavenger and did not pursue its prey. The wear on the molars suggests it regularly cracked bones. However, poorly known Korean Harpagolestes koreanicus could have been an active hunter due to its narrow, long and sharp lower molars.

References

External links
Harpagolestes – Palaeos 
Fossil data
science
Classification of Species
Digital Library
First mesonychid from Oregon

Mesonychids
Eocene mammals of Asia
Eocene genus extinctions
Prehistoric placental genera